The 2020–2023 La Niña event was a rare three-year, triple-dip La Niña. This La Niña event led to record-setting tropical cyclone activity in the North Atlantic Ocean during the 2020 and 2021 hurricane seasons.

Outline
La Niña refers to the reduction in the temperature of the ocean surface across the central and eastern equatorial Pacific, accompanied by notable changes in the tropical atmospheric circulation. This includes alterations in wind patterns, pressure, and rainfall.

The cold phase of the El Niño Southern Oscillation (ENSO), known as La Niña, typically produces contrasting effects on weather and climate compared to El Niño, which is the warm phase of the same phenomenon.

References

2020 meteorology
2021 meteorology
2022 meteorology
2023 meteorology
El Niño-Southern Oscillation events